Angmering & Findon is an electoral division of West Sussex in the United Kingdom and returns one member to sit on West Sussex County Council. The current County Councillor, Deborah Urquhart, is also Cabinet Member for Environment & Economy.

Extent
The division covers the villages of Angmering, Clapham, Findon, Patching and Poling.

It comprises the following Arun District wards: Angmering Ward and Findon Ward; and of the following civil parishes: Angmering, Clapham, Findon, Patching and Poling.

Election results

2021 Election
Results of the election held on 6 May 2021:

2017 Election
Results of the election held on 4 May 2017:

2013 Election
Results of the election held on 2 May 2013:

2009 Election
Results of the election held on 4 June 2009:

2006 Bye-election
Results of the bye-election held on 1 June 2006:

2005 Election
Results of the election held on 5 May 2005:

References

 Election Results - West Sussex County Council

External links
 West Sussex County Council
 Election Maps

Electoral Divisions of West Sussex